Luyana (Luyaana), also known as Luyi (Louyi, Lui, Rouyi), is a Bantu language spoken in Zambia and perhaps in small numbers in neighboring countries. It appears to be an divergent lineage of Bantu. It is spoken by the Luyana people, a subgroup of the Lozi people.

Ethnologue lists Kwandi, Mbowe, Mbume, and possibly Kwangwa ("Kwanga") as dialects. Maho (2009) classifies these as distinct languages; it is not clear if any of them are part of the divergent Luyana branch of Bantu, or if they are Kavango languages.

The writing system of the Luyana language was developed in 2011 and uses the Latin script.

The language is taught in primary schools and secondary schools.

Phonology

Vowels 

Luyana has five simple vowels: a, e, i, o, and u. o is almost always open and is rarely closed. Wherever there may be hesitation between o and u, u should be used.

There are no diphthongs. When two vowels meet, they contract, or one is omitted.

Consonants 

The consonant inventory of Luyana is shown below.

References

See also 
Mbowe language

Bantu languages
Languages of Zambia
Languages of Namibia